The women's team pursuit in the 2009–10 ISU Speed Skating World Cup was contested over four races on four occasions, out of a total of seven World Cup occasions for the season, with the first occasion involving the event taking place in Heerenveen, Netherlands, on 13–15 November 2009, and the last occasion taking place, also in Heerenveen, on 12–14 March 2010.

Canada won the cup, while Russia came second, and Germany came third. The defending champions, the Czech Republic, ended up in 11th place.

On the fourth competition weekend, Canada's team, comprised by Kristina Groves, Christine Nesbitt and Brittany Schussler,  set a new world record of 2:55.79.

Top three

Race medallists

Final standings
Standings as of 14 March 2010 (end of the season).

References

Women team pursuit
ISU